The Delaware Symphony Orchestra (DSO) is an orchestra based in the Wilmington, Delaware.  It was founded in 1929 by the merger of the Wilmington Symphony Orchestra with the Wilmington Music School.  The orchestra performs for 55,000 people annually, mostly in the Grand Opera House.

In 2009, the Orchestra got its first recording contract, from the Telarc International Corporation to record a CD along with the Los Angeles Guitar Quartet.

Members
Violin, Heidi Soberick, Luigi Mazzochi, Emily Niccholl, Lisa Vaupel, Martin Beech, Patrick DesRosiers, Molly Emerman, James Finegan, Lysiane Gravel-Lacombe, Eliezer Gutman, Pamela Hoppmann, Reina Inui, Thomas Jackson, Joan Knoblach, Kyungha Ko, Ruth Kreider, Audrey Kress, Rosaria Macera, Erica Miller, Donna Rudolph, Irina Schuck, Aino Wolfson, Yehong Xiong, Viola, Julia DiGaetani, Elizabeth Jaffe, Robin Massie-Jean, Christine Grossman, Nina Cottman, Ruth Frazier, Amy Leonard, Doris Loder, Pamela Nelson, Petula Perdikis, Alexandra VandeGeijn, Cello, Doug McNames, Paul Eves, Mark Ward, Karen Ahramjian, Carolyn Ellman, Cheryl Everill, Jie Jin, Eugene Klein, Louisa Hazen Marks, Winifred Martindale, Double bass, Daniel McDougall, Douglas Mapp, Boris Blumenkrants, Elizabeth Cochran (bassist), Arthur Marks, Richard Schlecker, Marc Seidenberg, William Zinno Jr., Flute, Kimberly Reighley, Eileen Grycky, Elena Yakovleva, Oboe, Jeffrey O'Donnell, Stephanie Wilson, Cor anglais, Lloyd Shorter, Clarinet, Charles Salinger, Daniel Spitzer, Bassoon, Chuck Holdeman, Jon Gaarder, Horn, Karen Mendocha, Lisa Dunham, James Rester, Katy Ambrose, Trumpet, Brian Kuszyk, Steven Skahill, Frank Ferraro, Trombone, Austin Westjohn, Richard Linn, Bass trombone, John McGinness, Tuba, Brian Brown, Timpani, Bill Wozniak, Percussion, William Kerrigan, Thomas Blanchard, Harp, Sarah Elizabeth Fuller

References

American orchestras
Wilmington, Delaware
Musical groups from Delaware
Musical groups established in 1929
Tourist attractions in Wilmington, Delaware
Wikipedia requested audio of orchestras
Non-profit organizations based in Delaware
1929 establishments in Delaware
Performing arts in Delaware